San Fernando Train Station is a former railway station located on the North Main Line in Pampanga, Philippines. The station was the site of a stopping place for Filipino and American prisoners of war during the Bataan death march in 1942. It is currently being rebuilt as part of the second phase of the North–South Commuter Railway. As part of the project, the old station will also be preserved. The old station is a historical landmark in the city.

History 
The station was inaugurated by Governor-General Eulogio Despujol and Bernardino Nozaleda, the Archbishop of Manila, on February 23, 1892. On June 27, 1892, José Rizal disembarked from this station to meet some recruits for La Liga Filipina and again the next day en route to Bacolor. In April 1942, during the Bataan Death March, the station served as the ending point for the 102-kilometer (63-mile) march from Bataan, from which Filipino and American prisoners-of-war were carted to Capas in Tarlac en route to their final destination, Camp O'Donnell.

The station has been closed since the ending of northbound rail services by Philippine National Railways (PNR) in 1988.

The station was to be rebuilt as a part of the Northrail project, which involved the upgrading of the existing single track to an elevated dual-track system, converting the rail gauge from narrow gauge to standard gauge, and linking Manila to Malolos in Bulacan and further on to Angeles City, Clark Special Economic Zone and Clark International Airport. The project commenced in 2007, but was repeatedly halted then discontinued in 2011.

Gallery

References 

Philippine National Railways stations
Railway stations in Pampanga
Marked Historical Structures of the Philippines
Buildings and structures in San Fernando, Pampanga